Toni Pagot (16 December 1921 – 7 July 2001) was an Italian comics artist and animator.

Life and career
Born Antonio Pagotto in Milan, in collaboration with his elder brother Nino, Pagot started his career in the fields of comics, animation and advertising. After the Second World War, the two brothers created with The Dynamite Brothers, the first Italian feature-length animated film and the first Italian film in Technicolor. In 1963, the Pagot brothers created their main successful character, the black chick Calimero. In the 1970s, Pagot turned to work as a comic artist for Il Corriere dei Piccoli, Il Giornalino and Il Corriere dei Ragazzi. He was also co-creator and director of the animated series Grisù.

His nephew Marco Pagot and niece Gi Pagot also work in animation. They collaborated in the production of Hayao Miyazaki's Sherlock Hound, and other Italo-Japanese productions including Soccer Fever, Montana Jones, and Reporter Blues.

References

External links
Tony Pagot at IMDb
 

Italian comics artists
Italian comics writers
1921 births
2001 deaths
Artists from Milan
Italian animators
Italian animated film directors
Italian animated film producers
Writers from Milan